The Arene Candide, (Cavern of the White sands)  is an archaeological site in Finale Ligure, Liguria, Italy. Its name was derived from the eponymous dune of white (candida) sand (arena) that could be found at the base of the cliff until the 1920s in the Caprazoppa promontory, where the Arene Candide cave is located.

Thanks to its position and to those openings the cave is well lit and relatively dry. It can be accessed from above within 30 minutes via a path from Borgio Verezzi.

History 
The cave is locally known as Grotta dei Frati or Armassa, and received its popular name in 1864, when Arturo Issel visited it, who was the first in a long series of archaeologists and geologists and researchers.

The Arene Candide gained international attention after the excavation campaigns in the years 1940 to 1942 and 1948 to 1950 in the south-eastern part of the cave, led by Luigi Bernabò Brea and Luigi Cardini. Their excavation brought a detailed stratigraphic sequence to light, that ranges from the Upper Palaeolithic to the Byzantine period. The favorable environmental conditions in the cave proved to be the key to the good state of conservation of the organic material like bone fossils and charcoal fragments. Due to their extraordinary preservation condition, the nineteen paleolithic burial pits, that were discovered in Arene Candide rank among the most significant funerary complexes in the world, as the material enabled researchers to conduct extensive and comprehensive anthropological studies in the framework of contemporary available scientific methods. Further excavations were carried out in the 1970s and the 2000s.

The most remarkable and scientifically valuable burial is called the "Young prince" (Giovane principe), a male around 15 years old, dated to about 23,500 years BP, attributed to the Gravettian culture. The blade was crafted from flint originating in the Forcalquier basin in south-eastern France. He died from a serious injury to the jaw and shoulder, possibly inflicted by a bear or big cat. This area was covered with yellow ochre before the final burial. Isotope analysis of the teeth revealed that approximately ¼ of the juveniles diet consisted of marine protein.

Excavation discoveries are on display in several Italian museums, including the Museum of Ligurian Archaeology in Genoa Pegli, the Archaeological Museum of Finale in Finale Ligure and the Pigorini National Museum of Prehistory and Ethnography in Rome.

References 

Archaeological sites in Liguria
Caves of Italy
Landforms of Liguria
Province of Savona
Prehistoric sites in Italy